The Djinang are an Aboriginal Australian people of the Northern Territory.

Name
The tribal ethnonym comes from an old form of the proximate deictic ('this'), namely

Country
The Djinang territories are often described in a way that overlaps with those of the Yan-nhaŋu. Norman Tindale, for example, allocates to them the  stretching over the Crocodile Islands and Milingimbi south to the mainland around the middle reaches of the Blyth River. On the continent they are said to extend east as far as the Glyde Inlet and river, as far as the northern margins of the Arafura Swamp. The modern authority on them, Bruce Waters, states that they are concentrated on the mainland, with only a few members on the islands.

Language
Djinang is classified as one of the Yolŋu languages, but is not mutually intelligible with them. It is most closely related to Djinba, with which it is about 60% cognate. In 1989 it was estimated that some 200 Djinang-speakers were living at Ramangiŋing, with small numbers also on Milingimbi and at Maningrida

Social organization
The Djinang are composed of seven clans
 Manyarring
 Marrangu
 Murrungun
 Balmbi
 Djadiwitjibi
 Mildjingi
 Wu(r)laki

Terms like 'clan' do not convey adequately the nature of the groups in such bands.  Marrangu-Djinang for example, haa been described as 'a local territory with focal sites and affiliated set of people and sacra. Each term — Marrangu and Djinang — when employed separately has potential to denote
a range of additional cultural references.'

History of contact
With the coming of mission stations to the area a large number of Djinang lived at Milingimbi, or ast Maningrida, down at least to the end of the 1960s. Though only a minority were converted to Christianity, the Djinang and the Djinba retain a strong sense of respect for the influence of the missions, which reduced the fear of sorcery, and revenge killings, that were a major concern to both tribes in their homelands.

Some words
  (mummy)
  (dog)
  (plains kangaroo)
  (no)
  (daddy)

Alternative names

 Balmawi
 Balmbi
 Barlmawi
 Djinnang, Djinhang
 Jandjinang, Jandjinung
 Manjarngi, (clan name) Manyarrngi
 Milingimbi, Millingimbi
 Munnarngo, Manarrngu
 Wulläkki, Wulaki, Ullaki, Wulagi
 Yandjinung, Yandjinning, Yandjinang

Source:

Notes

Citations

Sources

Yolngu